Big Ears is a 1931 Our Gang short comedy film directed by Robert F. McGowan. It was the 108th (20th) Our Gang short that was released.

Plot
Wheezer's mother and father continue to fight in an unconvincing and thoroughly hammy fashion over many different silly things, such as the coffee being too cold or the toast being burned. Wheezer overhears his father telling his mother that he is getting her a divorce. Not knowing what a divorce is, Wheezer tells Stymie, Dorothy, and Sherwood. They speculate on what a divorce means, at one point deciding it might be something good. Then Donald tells the gang what a divorce is, and people start sobbing. He even tells Wheezer that he will have no father anymore. His mother might either remarry and give him a stepfather and states that his step father beats him regularly. He also says that maybe his mother will throw him into an orphanage and not want him anymore.

Wheezer is frightened so he concocts a plot to make himself abominably sick so that his parents will come together out of concern from him. Wheezer visits a bathroom and his friends pour all the medicine in the medicine cabinet down his throat to make him ill, along with amounts of lard. He indeed gets sick and his plan presumably works. His parents kiss and make up and promise to never fight again and that they love Wheezer very much.

Notes
Big Ears marked a turnover with Allen Hoskins, Mary Ann Jackson, Norman Chaney, and Shirley Jean Rickert all leaving the gang. Jackie Cooper left shortly before the last episode, Fly My Kite. This left Bobby Hutchins as the only full-time Our Ganger left from the silent film era. A few fill-in recurring kids were also left from the silent era and the "Jackie Cooper era". Mary Ann's brother Dickie would remain for another two years as a recurring character. It also marked the first episode for Sherwood Bailey, who would have a featured role a few months later in Dogs is Dogs.
Big Ears was removed from the syndicated Little Rascals television package in 1971 primarily due to its depiction of a dangerous misuse of prescription drugs. Unlike most other episodes, this film was never available on home video until 1995, when it was released on VHS tape.

Cast

The Gang
 Bobby Hutchins as Wheezer                                   
 Matthew Beard as Stymie     
 Sherwood Bailey as Spud                                   
 Dorothy DeBorba as Dorothy                                  
 Donald Haines as Donald                                     
 Pete the Pup as Himself

Additional cast
 Johnnie Mae Beard as Stymie's mother
 Ann Christy as Wheezer's mother
 Gordon Douglas as Orderly
 Creighton Hale as Wheezer's father
 Wilfred Lucas as Doctor
 Dickie Jackson as Kid at hospital (scene deleted)

See also
 Our Gang filmography

References

External links

1931 films
American black-and-white films
Films directed by Robert F. McGowan
Hal Roach Studios short films
1931 comedy films
Our Gang films
1931 short films
1930s American films